The 2019 Women's FIH Olympic Qualifiers was the final stage of the qualification for the women's field hockey event at the 2020 Summer Olympics. It was held in October and November 2019.

Format
Originally, twelve teams were to take part in the Olympic qualifying events. These teams were to be drawn into six pairs; each pair playing a two-match, aggregate score series. The winner of each series qualified for the Olympics. As Japan won the 2018 Asian Games (thereby qualifying twice, once as host and once as Asian champions), there instead were 14 teams, seven of whom qualified. The seven Olympic qualifiers each featured two nations playing two back-to-back matches, with nations drawn to play each other based on their rankings at the end of the 2018 / 2019 Continental Championships. The qualifiers were held in October and November 2019 with the matches hosted by the higher-ranked of the two competing nations.

Qualification

The participating teams were confirmed on 29 August 2019 by the International Hockey Federation.

Seeding
The seeding was announced on 8 September 2019.

Overview
The first legs were played on 25 October or 1 and 2 November 2019, and the second legs on 26 October or 2 and 3 November 2019.

Matches

Australia won 9–2 on aggregate.

2–2 on aggregate. China won 2–1 after penalty-shootout.

Spain won 4–1 on aggregate.

India won 6–5 on aggregate.

Germany won 9–0 on aggregate.

Great Britain won 5–1 on aggregate.

0–0 on aggregate. Ireland won 4–3 after penalty-shootout.

Goalscorers

See also
2019 Men's FIH Olympic Qualifiers

Notes

References

External links
International Hockey Federation

Olympic Qualifiers
FIH Olympic Qualifiers
Field hockey at the Summer Olympics – Women's qualification tournaments